Gary and the Hornets was a Franklin, Ohio based garage rock band who were known for their single "Hi Hi Hazel".

History 
The band's first single was their version of "Hi Hi Hazel" which slipped into the Billboard Hot 100 charts at #96. Gary was eleven, Greg was fourteen and Steve was seven at the time they recorded their first material in 1966. This was followed by "There's a Kind of Hush" (titled "Kind of Hush" on their version) that was a local and regional hit; it also "bubbled under" the Billboard charts at #127.   The brothers recorded three more singles in 1967 and 1968. They also appeared on The Tonight Show Starring Johnny Carson in 1967 singing a cover of "Devil With a Blue Dress On."

In the 1960s the group did a commercial for Oscar Meyer wieners in which they sang and played the music to the "Oscar Meyer Weiner" jingle.  https://flatfieldrecords.com/gary-the-hornets-the-grooviest-band-to-ever-sing-about-weiners/

Greg's son, guitarist Casey Calvert, member of the rock band Hawthorne Heights died in 2007, at age 26.

Members 

 Gary Calvert - vocals, guitar
 Greg Calvert - bass guitar
 Steve Calvert - drums

Discography
Singles

 "Hi Hi Hazel" b/w "Patty Girl" - Smash Records [2061] (1966)
 "Kind of Hush" b/w "That's All for Now Sugar Baby" - Smash Records [2078] (1967) 
 "Times are Fine" one-sided flexi-disc - Smash Records (1967)
 "Baby It's You" b/w "Tell Tale" - Smash Records [2090] (1967) 
 "Turn On the World" b/w "Holdin' Back" - Smash Records [2145] (1968)

References

External links
 Gary & The Hornets discussion group on Yahoo!

Garage rock groups from Ohio
American musical trios
Sibling musical trios